Boston is a census-designated place in Nelson County, Kentucky, United States. Boston is along I-65; its ZIP code is 40107.

Boston is the home of Mount Moriah Baptist Church, organized in 1802. During 1929–1933, Mount Moriah was pastored by Dr. James L. Sullivan, who went on to be the president of the Baptist Sunday School Board (now Lifeway) and then president of the Southern Baptist Convention. Mount Moriah Baptist Church is a member of the Nelson County Baptist Association, Kentucky Baptist Convention, and Southern Baptist Convention. The earliest records of the church are lost, but it is believed that Mount Moriah Baptist was first constituted as Drennon's Lick Creek Baptist Church.

Demographics

Notable people

Colonel Henry Pierson Crowe, USMC, was born there in 1899. He served in World War I (which ended before he saw actual combat), the Banana Wars, the Pacific Ocean theater of World War II, and the Korean War. During his 43-year career, he was an enlisted man, distinguished marksman, warrant officer, and commissioned officer.

References

External links
Boston, Kentucky on Yahoo! Maps

 

Census-designated places in Nelson County, Kentucky
Census-designated places in Kentucky
Louisville metropolitan area